is a submarine volcano that is part of the Volcano Islands in the Bonin Islands of Japan.

Geography 
The volcano is part of a larger elongated submarine volcano with two peaks and with a magma composition of trachyandesite. The volcano itself has erupted on multiple occasions with the last eruption before 2021 occurring during 2010. The first island to form when this volcano was discovered formed in 1904–5 and with a few more forming during the course of the 1900s.

History 
The earliest recorded eruption of Fukutoku-Okanoba in 1904 formed an ephemeral island named Shin-Iwo-jima (New Sulfur Island). Other ephemeral islands have also formed, the most recent of which formed in 1986.
In 2021, the Japan Meteorological Agency (JMA) reported that a submarine eruption occurred at Fukutoku-Okanoba volcano at 6:20 a.m. local time on August 13. On August 16, it was confirmed that a new island had formed as a result of the latest eruption.

In October 2021, large quantities of pumice pebbles from Fukutoku-Okanoba damaged fisheries, tourism, the environment, 11 ports in Okinawa and 19 ports in Kagoshima prefecture. Clean-up operations took 2-3 weeks.

Timeline
At the end of the year, collapses will begin in various places.
 1916 : The island is submerged.
 1986 : An island was formed by a submarine eruption in January, but the island submerged in a short period of time until the end of March.
 2007 : On December 1, the Japan Meteorological Agency began announcing eruption warnings . Since then, "warning of surrounding sea areas" has been continued.
 2008 : Discolored water was confirmed for several months from around February.
 2010 : Due to the submarine eruption on February 3, eruptions and discolored water are observed in the surrounding area.
 2020 : On February 4, yellow-green discolored water was confirmed by the Japan Coast Guard observation.
 2021 : On August 13, the eruption of the seafloor was observed. Volcanic lightning was also observed. Volcanic ash is Bashi Channel beyond the South China Sea has been reached in the northeastern part. This eruption is considered to be one of the largest in Japan after the war. On August 17, Niijima was divided into two parts, east and west, and on October 20, it was confirmed that Niijima on the east side had disappeared. In October, a large amount of pumice seen to have erupted in this eruption, or more distant  Daito , Okinawa , Amami drifted to coast around.

Gallery

See also
 List of volcanoes in Japan

References

External links
 Article on 2005 eruption

Volcano Islands
Izu–Bonin–Mariana Arc
Submarine volcanoes
Active volcanoes
Ephemeral islands
Volcanoes of Tokyo
Former islands from the last glacial maximum